Brad Campbell may refer to:

Brad C. Campbell (born 1975), former Australian rules footballer for St Kilda
Brad L. Campbell (born 1975), former Australian rules footballer for Melbourne
Bradley M. Campbell (born 1961), American attorney and politician